Tevita Tuliʻakiʻono Tuipulotu Mosese Vaʻhae Fehoko Faletau Vea (born February 5, 1995), otherwise known as Vita Vea, is an American football nose tackle for the Tampa Bay Buccaneers of the National Football League (NFL). He played college football at Washington and was drafted by the Buccaneers in the first round of the 2018 NFL Draft.

College career
As a junior in 2017, Vea was the Pac-12 Defensive Player of the Year and won the Morris Trophy. On January 2, 2018, he declared his intention to enter the 2018 NFL Draft.

Professional career
Vea participated in the 2018 NFL Combine, but did not complete all drills due to a hamstring injury.

Vea was drafted by the Tampa Bay Buccaneers in the first round with the 12th overall pick in the 2018 NFL Draft.

2018 season
Vea strained his calf during training camp, causing him to miss the entire preseason as well as the first three games of the regular season. Vea recorded his first career sack in Week 10, during a 16–3 loss to the Washington Redskins.

He finished his rookie year with 28 tackles and three sacks.

2019 season

In Week 12, during a 35–22 win against the Atlanta Falcons, Vea recorded a sack, a career-best two pass deflections, and caught a one-yard touchdown pass from quarterback Jameis Winston. As a result, Vea became the first defensive player since J. J. Watt in 2014 to record a sack and catch a touchdown in the same game, the ninth player in NFL history to accomplish both in the same game, and the heaviest player in NFL history to catch a touchdown at 347 pounds. Overall, he started all 16 games and recorded 35 total tackles, 12 quarterback hits, and three passes defensed.

2020 season
During Thursday Night Football against the Chicago Bears in Week 5, Vea suffered fractures to his right leg and ankle after making a tackle on running back David Montgomery. Prior to the injury, Vea recorded one sack on Nick Foles during the 20–19 loss. Vea was placed on injured reserve on October 13, 2020. Vea was placed on the reserve/COVID-19 list by the team on November 28, 2020, and moved back to injured reserve on December 5. Vea was activated from injured reserve on January 22, 2021. In Super Bowl LV, Vea recorded one tackle during the Buccaneers' win over the Kansas City Chiefs.

2021 season

On April 26, 2021, the Buccaneers picked up Vea's fifth-year option, guaranteeing Vea $7.6 million for the 2022 season. In the Week 11 loss to the Washington Football Team, Vea suffered a knee injury in the fourth quarter and was carted off the field.

On January 8, 2022, Vea signed a four-year, $73 million extension with the Buccaneers. As a result of the Los Angeles Rams advancing to Super Bowl LVI, Vea was selected to his first career Pro Bowl as an alternate for defensive tackle Aaron Donald.

NFL career statistics

Personal life
Vea is the son of Sione and Fipe Vea, from Tonga.

References

External links

Tampa Bay Buccaneers bio
Washington Huskies bio

1995 births
Living people
American football defensive tackles
American people of Tongan descent
People from Milpitas, California
Players of American football from California
Sportspeople from Santa Clara County, California
Tampa Bay Buccaneers players
Washington Huskies football players